My Weird School is a series of humorous chapter books written by Dan Gutman and illustrated by Jim Paillot, first published in July 2004. Further series include My Weird School Daze (2008-2011), My Weirder School (2011-2014), My Weirdest School (2015-2018) and My Weirder-est School (2019-2022).

The series takes place in a school whose teachers display bizarre behaviors, with each title focusing on a specific teacher. Each book in the series has a rhyme in the title. The main character, A.J., is a boy who hates school. His rival is a girl named Andrea, who loves school and has a friend, Emily, that A.J. considers a "crybaby." Much of the humor is derived from the plot's unlikely situations and the teachers' personalities which are written to be "outlandish."

Gutman was initially inspired to write the books after being exposed to the Junie B. Jones series by Barbara Park and wanted to write something similar from a boy's point of view. Gutman says that he has been inspired by visiting real-life schools, going to 60 schools a year to gather material. He has also stated that his goal in writing the books is to interest children in reading and especially to make reading fun for children who have difficulty in school. The series' defining characteristic of strange teachers comes from Gutman's belief that children enjoy reading about "grownups doing dumb things." Gutman feels that along with having his own son, the series My Weird School helped launch his writing career.

Books

My Weird School (2001-2008)

My Weird School Daze (2008-2011)

My Weirder School (2011-2014)

My Weird School Special (2013-2022)
Various spinoff specials have been published from 2013 to 2022.

My Weirdest School (2015-2018)

My Weird School: I Can Read (2016-2018)
A series of early reading books as part of the I Can Read! line.

My Weirder-est School (2019-2022)

My Weird School Fast Facts (2016-2019)
A series of nonfiction books with facts presented by A.J. and Andrea.

My Weird School Graphic Novel (2021-) 
A series of graphic novels.

My Weirdtastic School (2023-)

Supplementary books and media
Disappointed by the writing skills of the fans who write him letters, Gutman created a spinoff book in 2013, My Weird Writing Tips, to teach readers how to write.

Audiobook versions of My Weird School have been bundled together with books 1-4 released together.

During lockdowns associated with COVID-19, Gutman has hosted a "My Weird Read-A-Loud" series. Gutman has also read online from the My Weird School series for #OperationStoryTime on Instagram, Facebook and YouTube.

Reception
Kirkus Reviews said that the first book, Miss Daisy is Crazy!, is "a sure-fire hit for the most reluctant reader." Publishers Weekly also notes that the series is a good choice for beginning readers. The Reading Teacher mentioned the series in their 2008 article on choosing books for children that they will enjoy reading. Some books, such as Class Pet Mess!, do contain more challenging vocabulary. Mrs. Cooney Is Looney! uses homophones to provide humor.

My Weirder School continues the trend of using humor that began in the My Weird School series. Booklist calls the series habit forming, writing, "Fortunately, the habit is reading." Booklist has also called the depiction of some of the adults in the series as "satire."

The Weird School Fast Facts series has been reviewed favorably. School Library Journal called the drawings "hilarious" in both My Weird School Fast Facts: Sports and My Weird School Fast Facts: Geography. School Library Journal also noted that Gutman's writing was especially suited to his audience of younger readers. Booklist wrote that Sports was entertaining and informative.

My Weird Writing Tips is a book written to help students become better writers. School Library Journal wrote that the book makes "grammar entertaining," but criticized the introduction for not being sensitive to the issues faced by bilingual students and others who have trouble with grammar. Booklist, however, felt that My Weird Writing Tips was extremely funny and informative for a broad group of young readers. Kirkus Reviews found the book to have useful information even if the tone of the book was "disingenuous at times and too self-consciously fun."

The first four books released as an audiobook in 2005 were read by John Beach. His narration was good at capturing the voices of the characters in the stories, according to Booklist. School Library Journal praised the narration of Jared Goldsmith on the audiobook, Miss Cooney Is Looney!, for capturing the voice of A.J. in a way that "brings him to life."

The series has been very successful with young readers, although Common Sense Media notes in a review that the series sometimes reinforces gender stereotypes. The series also receives criticism for characters having caricatured personalities and repetitive plots.

References

External links
Official website

Book series introduced in 2004
American children's book series
2000s books
2010s books
Novels set in elementary and primary schools